Chalisa Junction railway station is located in Pakistan.

See also
 List of railway stations in Pakistan
 Pakistan Railways

References

External links

Railway stations in Jhelum District
Railway stations on Dandot Light Railway Line
Railway stations on Malakwal–Khushab branch line